Sacred promontory or sacred cape or holy promontory or cape was a name assigned by the ancient Greeks and Romans to salient promontories extending into large bodies of water at strategic locations, typically containing a temple to the god of the sea. The English translates Latin sacrum promunturium and ancient Greek ἱερὸν ἀκρωτήριον (hieron akrōtērion). Some sacred promontories were:
 Cap Corse, northern Corsica
 Cape Fiolente, Crimea (vicinity of Sevastopol)
 Cape Gelidonya, southern coast of Turkey
 Cape Kyllini, located in Kastro-Kyllini, Elis, Greece
 Cape St. Vincent, southern Portugal
 Holyhead, Wales
 Hook Head, Wexford, Ireland
 Pallene, Chalcidice, northern Aegean Sea
 Sagres Point, southern Portugal
 Sounion, near Athens
 Triopium promontorium in Turkey

See also
 Sacral promontory
 Promontorium Sacrum (disambiguation)

Promontory